Harry Goring may refer to:

Harry Goring (footballer) (1927–1994), English footballer
Sir Harry Goring, 4th Baronet, English politician, MP for Steyning and Horsham
Sir Harry Goring, 6th Baronet, British Member of Parliament for New Shoreham
Sir Harry Goring, 8th Baronet, British Member of Parliament for New Shoreham

See also
Henry Goring (disambiguation)